The Governor's House (previously known as the Government House, Governor-General's House and President's House) in Karachi, Sindh, Pakistan is the official residence of the governor of Sindh. The current governor of Sindh is Kamran Tessori. It is located along the Aiwan-e-Sadar Road of Karachi.

Built in 1939, it is a historical building and has been the residence of several prominent figures, including the Commissioners and pre-independence British governors of Sindh, followed by the Governor-Generals of Pakistan, the President of Pakistan and then by the Governors of present-day Sindh province.

History

Old Government House
The Sindh Governor House is located on the original site of the now-demolished Government House, which was built in the year 1843 by Sir Charles Napier while Sindh was part of the British Raj. The Government House had been constructed for Napier's personal use. When Napier left in 1847, the house was bought by the Government of British India and used as an official residence by the Commissioners of Sindh up until 1936.

British Raj
The construction of the present Governor House building started in the year 1936 by renowned architect R.T. Russel and was completed in 1939, at a cost of 700,000 rupees. The new building was built to replace the Government House, which had been in a state of disrepair and was no longer suitable for habitation. Sir Lancelot Graham, the first Governor of Sindh, laid the foundation stone of the building and started using it as his residence in 1939. After Graham, the succeeding governors of Sindh, Sir Hugh Dow (1941–1946) and Sir Francis Mudie (1946–1947), also lived in the building.

Post-independence
Following Pakistan's independence in August 1947 and Karachi's designation as the country's capital, the building became the residence of Muhammad Ali Jinnah, the founder of Pakistan and its first Governor-General. From that point onward, the building became known as the "Governor-General's House" and was used as an official residence by all Governor-Generals of Pakistan who succeeded Jinnah. Jinnah had continued to reside in the house until his death in September 1948. 

In 1956, the post of Governor-General was abolished and replaced by the President of Pakistan, thus making the last governor-general of Pakistan, Iskandar Mirza, the country's first elected president. The building was thereafter referred to as the "President's House." 

By the 1970s, Karachi was no longer the capital of Pakistan; the federal government was shifted to Islamabad. With the dissolution of the One Unit scheme and revival of provinces, Karachi was designated the capital city of Sindh. The house eventually became the residence of the Governor of Sindh and continues to be so as of present.

See also

 Governor of Sindh
 Government Houses of the British Empire and Commonwealth
 Governor's House (Lahore)
 Governor's House (Peshawar)

References

External links
 Official website: Governor of Sindh
 Governor House Karachi at Wikimapia

Buildings and structures in Karachi
Karachi

Governor's houses in Pakistan
Memorials to Muhammad Ali Jinnah
Heritage sites in Karachi